Caluera is a genus of flowering plants in the orchid family, Orchidaceae. It contains three species, all native to South America:

Caluera surinamensis Dodson & Determann - Suriname, Venezuela, Brazil
Caluera tavaresii Campacci & J.B.F.Silva - Brazil
Caluera vulpina Dodson & Determann - French Guiana, Ecuador

See also 
 List of Orchidaceae genera

References 

 Pridgeon, A.M., Cribb, P.J., Chase, M.A. & Rasmussen, F. eds. (1999). Genera Orchidacearum 1. Oxford Univ. Press.
 Pridgeon, A.M., Cribb, P.J., Chase, M.A. & Rasmussen, F. eds. (2001). Genera Orchidacearum 2. Oxford Univ. Press.
 Pridgeon, A.M., Cribb, P.J., Chase, M.A. & Rasmussen, F. eds. (2003). Genera Orchidacearum 3. Oxford Univ. Press
 Berg Pana, H. 2005. Handbuch der Orchideen-Namen. Dictionary of Orchid Names. Dizionario dei nomi delle orchidee. Ulmer, Stuttgart

External links 

Oncidiinae genera
Oncidiinae